Tõnu Aav (21 January 1939 – 14 August 2019) was an Estonian stage, film, TV, and radio actor.

Aav was born in Tallinn and graduated from the Estonian Academy of Music and Theatre in 1961. From 1961 he performed at the Estonian Drama Theatre in Tallinn. He played in dozens of films and twenty screenplays and also recorded a number of radio play and audio CDs (including Uncle Remus stories and Alice in Wonderland) as well as a recurring role as Feliks Viss on the ETV dramatic series Õnne 13.

From 1965 until 1974 Aav was married to actress Irja Aav (née Pilvet). The couple had two sons, music producer and conductor Lauri Aav and prop maker Ardi Aav.

Awards
Aav's awards include:
1971: Honorary title of Honored Actor of Estonian SSR
1992: Meie Mats Humor Prize
2001: Class 5 Order of the White Star
2010: Oskar Luts Humor Prize

References

External links 
 Eva Kübar,  Tõnu Aav 70: tahan, et mul oleks teatris rohkem huvitavaid rolle Postimees, 21 January 2009
 Rainer Kerge, Tõnu Aav 70: Jänkuonu, mis sa nüüd teed? Õhtuleht, 21 January 2009
 Maris Balbat, Tõnu Aav: Iga etendust peaks mängima kui elu viimast Maaleht, 22 January 2009

1939 births
2019 deaths
Estonian male film actors
Estonian male stage actors
Estonian male television actors
Estonian male voice actors
Recipients of Meie Mats
Recipients of the Order of the White Star, 5th Class
Male actors from Tallinn
Estonian Academy of Music and Theatre alumni
20th-century Estonian male actors
21st-century Estonian male actors